Carnival Night is a 1956 Soviet musical film. It is Eldar Ryazanov's first big-screen film, Lyudmila Gurchenko's first role and also one of the most famous films starring popular comedian Igor Ilyinsky. Produced during the Khrushchev Thaw, the film became the Soviet box office leader of 1956 with a total of 48.64 million tickets sold. Today it remains a highly popular New Year's Eve classic in Russia and the post-Soviet space.

Plot

It is New Year's Eve and the employees of a House of Culture are ready with their annual New Year's entertainment program. It includes a lot of dancing and singing, jazz band performance and even magic tricks. Suddenly, an announcement is made that a new director has been appointed and that he is arriving shortly. Comrade Ogurtsov arrives in time to review and disapprove of the scheduled entertainment. To him, holiday fun has a different meaning, he imagines speakers reading annual reports to show the club's progress over the year and a lecturer speaking for 40 minutes about the possibility of life on the planet Mars. And, perhaps, a bit of serious music, something from the Classics, played by the Veterans' orchestra.

Obviously, no one wants to change the program with only a few hours before the show, much less to replace it with something so boring. So everyone teams up in order to prevent Ogurtsov from getting to the stage. They manage to trap Ogurtsov by any means necessary so that the acts can perform their scheduled pieces, and celebrate New Year's Eve as originally planned.

Cast 
 Igor Ilyinsky as Serafim Ivanovich Ogurtsov, acting club director
 Lyudmila Gurchenko as Lena Krylova
 Yuri Belov as Grisha Koltsov, electrician
 Andrei Tutyshkin as Fyodor Petrovich Mironov, bookkeeper
 Olga Vlasova as Adelaida Kuzminichna Romashkina, librarian
 Tamara Nosova as Tosya Burigina, Ogurtsov's secretary
 Georgi Kulikov as Seryozha Usikov, painter
 Gennadi Yudin as Jazz band Conductor
 Vladimir Zeldin as Nikolayev, Tip Clown
 Boris Petker as Nikolay Sidorov, Top Clown
 Sergei Filippov as Comrade Nekadilov, lecturer
 Shmelev Sisters as Singing Waitresses
 Gusakov Brothers as Step Dancers
 Tamara Sokolova and Petr Pomazkov as Dancers

Crew
Director: Eldar Ryazanov
Writers: Boris Laskin, Vladimir Polyakov
Cinematography: Arkady Koltsaty
Composer: Anatols Liepiņš (Anatoly Lepin)
Music orchestration: Eddie Rosner, also jazz band leader (uncredited)

Production
Mosfilm's director of that time Ivan Pyryev was the one who appointed Eldar Ryazanov to direct the picture despite Ryazanov not having interest in musicals at that time. Pyryev was heavily involved in the making of the film, assisting Ryazanov every step of the way.

Because the picture was Ryazanov's first directorial experience, the young director was met with severe skepticism and after seeing half of the filmed material the artistic council was convinced that the film would turn out to be a huge failure.

Initially Lyudmila Gurchenko was rejected for the role of Lena Krylova by director Eldar Ryazanov and the artist council. Another actress was hired, however she could not handle the part. Then Ryazanov came to Pyryev with the appeal to hire a new actress, adding that anyone but Gurchenko should be signed up for the role of Krylova. But when Pyryev later saw Gurchenko in the Mosfilm corridor, he decided that there was something special about her. Pyryev brought her to the set and announced that she will act in the film.

The film was made in five months, with most of the scenes shot in the Russian Army Theatre.

Sequel
In 2006 Ryazanov made a sequel to the picture, called "Carnival Night 2, or Fifty Years Later" starring Alyona Babenko and Sergei Bezrukov.

References

External links
 
 

1956 films
1956 musical comedy films
1950s Russian-language films
Films directed by Eldar Ryazanov
Mosfilm films
Soviet musical comedy films
Russian musical comedy films
Films set around New Year
1956 directorial debut films